Anna Aleksandrovna Prugova (born 20 November 1993) is a Russian ice hockey player and member of the Russian national ice hockey team, currently playing in the Zhenskaya Hockey League (ZhHL) with Agidel Ufa.

A two-time Olympian, she represented Russia in the women's ice hockey tournaments at the Winter Olympic Games in 2010 and 2014. During the 2010 Winter Olympics, Prugova was the youngest woman competing in ice hockey, aged 16 years and 86 days.

She has participated in six IIHF Women's World Championships, winning bronze medals at the 2013 and 2016 tournaments, and won silver with the Russian team in the women's ice hockey tournament at the 2013 Winter Universiade.

Career statistics

Olympics

References

External links
 
 
 

instagram 

1993 births
Living people
Ice hockey players at the 2010 Winter Olympics
Ice hockey players at the 2014 Winter Olympics
Olympic ice hockey players of Russia
Sportspeople from Khabarovsk
Russian women's ice hockey goaltenders
Universiade medalists in ice hockey
Universiade silver medalists for Russia
Competitors at the 2013 Winter Universiade
HC Tornado players
HC Agidel Ufa players